Megalycinia is a genus of moths in the family Geometridae first described by Wehrli in 1939.

Species
Megalycinia serraria (A. Costa, 1882)
Megalycinia strictaria (Lederer, 1853)
Megalycinia scalaria (Christoph, 1893)

References

Boarmiini